Donald Weilerstein (born 1940) is an American violinist and pedagogue.

Early life and education 
Weilerstein was born in Washington, D.C. and raised in Berkeley, California. He began playing the violin at the age of four and earned a Bachelor of Music and Master of Music from the Juilliard School.

Career 
In 1969, he founded the Cleveland Quartet, becoming its first violinist, a position he held until 1989. Since 2004, he has been the Dorothy Richard Starling Chair in Violin Studies at New England Conservatory of Music and since 2001, he is a faculty member at the Juilliard School. His students have won first prize in the Yehudi Menuhin International Competition for Young Violinists and first prize in the International Violin Competition of Indianapolis. In addition, he is a member of the Weilerstein Trio with his daughter, Alisa Weilerstein, and wife, Vivian Hornik Weilerstein. Weilerstein is a fellow of the Music Academy of the West.

References

American classical violinists
Male classical violinists
American male violinists
Jewish classical violinists
Violin pedagogues
Juilliard School faculty
Living people
1940 births
Music Academy of the West alumni
21st-century classical violinists
21st-century American male musicians
People from Berkeley, California
Musicians from Berkeley, California
21st-century American violinists